Saint Wenceslas Cathedral is a gothic cathedral at Wenceslas Square in Olomouc, in the Czech Republic, founded in 1107. The square was named after Saint Wenceslaus I, Duke of Bohemia on the thousandth anniversary of his death in 935. The cathedral is also named after him.

The cathedral is the seat of the Roman Catholic Archdiocese of Olomouc.

History

The cathedral began in the Romanesque style and was consecrated in 1131. Extensive Gothic modifications were made in 13th and 14th century.

Bohemian king Wenceslaus III of Bohemia was murdered in a nearby house of the former dean of the cathedral on 4 August 1306. Wenceslaus III was the last of the male Přemyslid rulers of Bohemia.

Gothic revival changes, which included refacing the building, rebuilding the west front and the construction of the central tower, were made during 1883–1892. These were designed by Gustav Meretta and R. Völkel.

The cathedral was restored in 2004–2007.

Architecture
The cathedral is formed by three towers. The front two form the front, while the third one in the back, the southern tower, is with its  height the tallest church tower in Moravia, and the second tallest church tower in the Czech Republic.

References

External links

 Description and history of the cathedral

Religious buildings and structures completed in 1131
12th-century Roman Catholic church buildings
14th-century Roman Catholic church buildings in the Czech Republic
Gothic Revival church buildings in the Czech Republic
Churches in Olomouc
Roman Catholic cathedrals in the Czech Republic
Wenceslaus I, Duke of Bohemia